Black jay is a common name which can refer to two unrelated birds:

 In Tasmania it is the local name for the black currawong (Strepera fuliginosa) of the family Artamidae.
 Black magpies, in the genus Platysmurus, from Borneo, Sumatra, Malaysia, and southern Thailand.

Bird common names